The Gampaha Municipal Council is the local council for Gampaha, the second urban town of Gampaha District, Sri Lanka after Negombo. It has 30 members elected under the mixed electoral system where 60% of members will be elected using first-past-the-post voting and the remaining 40% through closed list proportional representation.

History 

The Urban Council of Gampaha has a history that stretches back to 1945. Two Gazette notifications (No. 1142/22 of August 2000, and No. 117/7 of March 2001) established the Gampaha Municipal Council, which held its first meeting on 15 April 2002.

Structure 
Currently there are 30 seats in the council.

Demographics 

Gampaha Municipal Council consists of 33 Grama Niladhari divisions, with a combined population of 62,797:

Ethnic Groups

Notes

References 

Local authorities in Western Province, Sri Lanka
Municipal councils of Sri Lanka
2002 establishments in Sri Lanka